These Are Special Times is a one-off American television special by Canadian singer Celine Dion that was broadcast by CBS on 25 November 1998. The special was a promotion for her first English Holiday album of the same name, These Are Special Times. The special was filmed in front of a live studio audience. It featured Dion (backed by her touring band and a full orchestra) performing holiday music from the album as well as some of her hits. She was also joined by special guests comedic actress and singer Rosie O'Donnell and Italian Tenor Andrea Bocelli. The special also included footage of Dion in her hometown of Charlegmagne, Quebec.

The special was met with praise and drew an audience of more than sixteen million viewers. Additionally, it received two Emmy Award nominations. It was later released on DVD as part of the Collector's Edition re-release of the These Are Special Times album in 2007.

Set list
 "The Power of Love"
 "Do You Hear What I Hear?" (duet with Rosie O'Donnell)
 "O Holy Night"
 "Because You Loved Me" 
 "Let's Talk About Love" 
 "The First Time Ever I Saw Your Face"
 "My Heart Will Go On" 
 "The Prayer" (duet with Andrea Bocelli)
 "Ave Maria" (performed by Andrea Bocelli)
 "Feliz Navidad"
 "These Are the Special Times"

References

Celine Dion
1998 television specials
CBS television specials